is a train station in Izumo, Shimane Prefecture, Japan. It is on the Taisha Line, operated by the Ichibata Electric Railway.

This station is only served by local services.

Lines
 Ichibata Electric Railway
 Taisha Line

Adjacent stations

|-
!colspan=5|Ichibata Electric Railway

References

Bataden Taisha Line
Railway stations in Shimane Prefecture
Railway stations in Japan opened in 1930